Red Star Parcels was a service which used passenger trains for transporting parcels between passenger railway stations throughout the United Kingdom, owned and operated by British Rail. It was introduced experimentally on 1 April 1963. Senders could despatch their consignments to selected stations at which the parcels were collected by the recipient. 

The service used scheduled trains, and as such, was one of the fastest methods of transporting a package long distances around the country.

Red Star Parcels no longer trades, although signage bearing the logo of Red Star can be seen at railway stations across the United Kingdom, including; Bradford Interchange, Bournemouth Central, Birmingham New Street, Brighton, Littlehampton, London Euston, York, Derby, Stoke-On-Trent, Stafford, Southend Victoria, Great Yarmouth and more.

In 2011 the service concept was revived by new startup 5PL Ltd, initially carrying parcels on scheduled East Midlands Trains passenger services. Renamed InterCity RailFreight Ltd, the parcel-carrying services have since expanded onto other franchised passenger train networks including Great Western Railway. InterCity RailFreight secured a national rail industry award in 2017 for service innovation.

History

British Rail's registered parcel service
In April 1963, British Rail set up Red Star, an express registered parcel delivery service to compete against the General Post Office.

Association with City Link
In 1969, City Link Transport Services Limited (a private company) was established in order to offer a transfer service between London termini. Shortly thereafter, City Link introduced the concept of same and next day delivery throughout the United Kingdom, utilising the Red Star parcels service to transport its packages from station to station where City Link agents (later to become franchisees) would collect and deliver the final mile.

So successful was the service, that City Link promoted it as Red Star Parcels Door to Door. The concept was also promoted widely by British Rail's own freight sales force, which later helped City Link to become the largest single user of Red Star. In 1982, British Rail introduced its own door to door parcels service, calling it Night Star, a brand which was later quietly dropped. 

City Link was appointed as the delivery agent with a five-year contract (and a two-year extension) and this eventually led to the downfall of the relationship between the two organisations. In 1989, following suspicions and allegations that both parties were competing directly with each other, City Link started the transition of moving its parcels from rail to road.

Management buyout
The government made several attempts to privatise Red Star Parcels. The British Railways Board attempted to sell it in June 1993, attracting seven bids. Only two were considered to be serious; and in November 1993, the board recommended that the sale be abandoned. From 1993 to 1994, John MacGregor, Secretary of State for Transport, attempted unsuccessfully to sell it off. 

On 5 September 1995, it was sold to a management buyout, for a peppercorn rent; the cost of the sale was recorded as £0.3 million. Privatisation of the network led to the creation of private passenger train companies, and the loss of a national network heralded the start of the demise of Red Star.

Acquisition by Lynx Express
In January 1999, Red Star was acquired by Lynx Express, that was in turn itself acquired by UPS in September 2005.

Closure 
All Red Star parcels offices in stations closed on 25 May 2001, with the loss of 360 jobs. Lynx blamed the closure on network disruption after the accident in Hatfield in October 2000.

References

British Rail brands
Former nationalised industries of the United Kingdom
1963 establishments in the United Kingdom
British Rail subsidiaries and divisions
British Rail freight services